Ceremonial Castings are an American black metal band from Washington. Described as "Bewitching Black Metal", they play a unique style surrounded in black magic & the arts of witchcraft. They embarked on a Central American tour with Norway's Gorgoroth in September 2012.

History
Ceremonial Castings began in the late fall of 1996. The band was founded by still existing members Jake Superchi (The Witcher) & brother Nick Superchi (OldNick). The basis of the writing & the lyrical foundation striving on the art of black magic, witchcraft & rituals that could only lead to the name of Ceremonial Castings.

Hailing from the town Battle Ground which is located in the dark forests of Washington state (USA) it is no surprise that the curses that are spewed forth are a perfect mix of unrelenting majestic chaos. The recipe contains itself with the magicks of Black, Death, & Thrash Metal to Classical, Symphonic & Dark Ambient combining into the band's self deemed sound as "American Deathphonic Black Metal" or now known as "Bewitching Black Metal".

Both Lord Serpent and Old Nick are involved in musical projects ranging from death metal, to black metal, to ambient. Links to these various projects can be found on Ceremonial Castings' Myspace page.

The Brothers Superchi also happen to be related to the renowned author, Nathaniel Hawthorne, as they are direct descendants of Nathaniel's great-great-grandfather, Judge John Hathorne.

Discography

Albums
 Immortal Black Art (2005)
 Barbaric is the Beast (2006)
 Salem 1692 (2008)
 Into the Black Forest of Witchery (remastered + bonus tracks 2008)
 Beast In Black (2010)
 March Of The Deathcult (2011)
 Bewitching Black Metal (2013)
 Reign In Hell (A Tribute to Slayer) (2013)
 Cthulu   (2014)

Demos & EP's
 Witchcraft (tape 1996)
 Vampira (1997)
 Demonic (1998)
 Blood Like Wine (2000)
 Vampira - The Second Coming (2000)
 13 Roses (2000)
 The Garden of Dark Delights (2001)
 The Chaos Chapter (2002)
 Into The Black Forest Of Witchery (2002)
 Fullmoon Passions (2002)
 Midnight Deathcult Phenomena (2003)
 Universal Funeral March (2003)
 The Extermination Process (2003)
 Into The Black Forest Of Witchery (re-recording) (2004)

Other projects

Thy Emptiness
J.S. - All Vocals, Guitars & Drums

O.N. - All keys, synths & piano

 Crowned Under Cascade Rain (2013)

The Dead
Nick The Gremlin - Vocals, Guitars, Keys, Bass 
Jake O' Lantern - Drums

 They Come For Brains (2001)
 Start Killing (2006)
 Cadaver Cuts (Split) (2007)

Mysticism Black
Old Nick - All Instruments

 War Hymns Of The Dark Communion (Demo) (2002)
 The Rite Of War (Split Album) (2003)
 The Dark Erudition (2006)
  Return Of The Bestial Flame (2019)

Serpent Lord
Lord Serpent - All Instruments

 Battle Horns (Demo) (2003)
 The Rite Of War (Split Album) (2003)
 The Order Of The Snake'' (Demo) (2004)

Sources

Official Ceremonial Castings site

References

American black metal musical groups
Musical groups established in 1996
Heavy metal musical groups from Washington (state)
American musical trios
Symphonic black metal musical groups